Memoir '44 is a light wargame, or war-themed strategy board game, for two players created by Richard Borg, published in 2004 by Days of Wonder and illustrated by Julien Delval and Cyrille Daujean. The game can also be played with up to six players if played in teams and up to eight players in the "Overlord" scenarios that require two copies of the game. It received the 2004 International Gamers Award for General Strategy, 2-Player category and The Wargamer 2004 Award for Excellence. The game is published in English and French (as Mémoire 44) by Days of Wonder.

Memoir '44 simulates over a dozen of the battles connected with the D-Day invasions in World War II. It uses an enhanced version of the same Command & Colors game system as found in Battle Cry.

Gameplay Summary

Players start the game by choosing a scenario, representing a battle from World War II. Scenarios are available from the manual, the internet, or can be invented by players. The terrain and starting positions are laid out according to the scenario.

The battlefield, on a hexagon-gridded board, is divided into three sections by two red dotted lines, giving each player a left flank, a center and a right flank section.

Troops are commanded by playing a command card, which orders troops to move, battle and/or execute a special command. There are two types of command cards: Section cards and Tactic cards. Section cards are used to order a move and/or battle in a specific section. These cards indicate in which sections of the battlefield units may be given orders, and how many units may be commanded. Tactic cards allow players to make special moves, battle in a specific way or take special actions, as explained on the card.

The object of the game is to be the first to win a set number of Victory Medals, usually 4 to 6, depending on the selected battle scenario's victory conditions. A Victory Medal is gained for each enemy unit entirely eliminated from the battlefield. In some scenarios, additional Medals may be gained from the board map itself, for capturing and holding certain terrain hexagons (hexes) or battlefield objectives.

Scenarios
There are a dozen scenarios in the base game as well as several more in the various expansions. Most of these scenarios are created from famous battles in World War II. Official scenarios (the ones published in scenario booklets and on the Days of Wonder internet site) have full support from the DoW team and are thoroughly playtested to ensure balance between the two players (e.g. not a total overrun of German troops at the start of the Soviet campaign) and others represent tougher battles like the assault on Omaha Beach, where the Allied player has difficulty in crossing the beach inland.

Another section online is devoted to scenarios the Memoir '44 owners themselves created. These are unofficial and so not playtested by the DoW team, but mostly by the creators themselves. (In rare cases these scenarios are later adopted officially.) These scenarios allow the Memoir '44 player to have experiences designed by other players.

Command cards
Command Cards are used to order soldiers around the board. Command Cards are divided in two types: Section and Tactic cards. There are a total of 60 Command Cards which is divided into 40 section cards and 20 tactic cards. A Command Card is played first to start each turn, followed by ordering units. After all orders are completed, a player replenishes their hand by drawing a new Command Card from the deck.

Section cards
Section cards are cards that specify the number of units ordered in a specific section. These numbers run from 1-3 and All (meaning that all the units in a particular section can be ordered). Examples include "Probe Left Flank" (allowing a player to order 2 units on the left flank) and "Assault Right Flank" (allowing a player to order all units on the right flank).

A special section card is Recon-1 (with particular section: left, center or right). A player may only order 1 unit in the section stated on the card but at the end of the turn the usual drawing of one Command card is replaced by a choice of one from two Command cards.

Every turn, a maximum of one card can be played, except for the Ambush Tactic Card, which is played against an action by the other player.

Tactic cards
Tactic Cards are different from section cards in that they do not specify exactly a number of orders in a certain section. These tactic cards consist of special actions or enhancements to battling (such as adding an extra die).

Examples include "Armor Assault" (order four tank units, units in Close Assault, next to the enemy unit, may battle with an extra die) and "Medics and Mechanics" (order one unit, roll dice to 'heal/repair' the unit by adding figures according to number of dice, and let it move and battle).

Expansions

Days of Wonder has released several expansions to the game. All these expansions require at least one copy of the original game to be played. The expansions are listed in chronological date of release.

Terrain Pack
This expansion pack consists mostly of new terrain, landmarks and badges, and only 4 scenarios. Its main purpose is to allow for a much greater variety in scenario creation. Using its components players can design a wide variety of new scenarios, and are able to tap into the hundreds of user-developed scenarios from the Memoir 44 website. Examples of tiles include landmarks like a radar station (with optional special rules), roads (which enhance movement), railroads and a train, new bridges and badges (Airborne, engineers).
Terrain Pack

Eastern Front
This expansion pack comes with a new side, the Soviet Union. The Red Army consists of Infantry figures, T-34 tanks and the ZIS-3 Artillery gun.  It contains terrain, mainly winter terrain, badges, a Commissar Chip, and extra rules to play one of the 8 new scenarios included with the game.
Eastern Front

Winter / Desert Board Map
This is a new board for use with the expansions. One side features a desert map for use with the Terrain Pack and Mediterranean Theatre expansion and the other side features a winter map for use with the Eastern Front expansion or snowy scenarios on the Western Front.
Simplified Campaign Rules and Blitz Rules are also added.
Winter Desert Board

Pacific Theatre
This expansion features the Japanese army including infantry figures, Type 95 Ha-Go light tanks, and the Type 88 75 mm AA Gun used as artillery piece. The expansion also features new terrain tiles, all in Pacific style, with jungles, rice paddies and more. Also included are War Ships (destroyer, Aircraft carrier) and the night visibility chart, which influences fighting and range.
Pacific Theater

Air Pack
This expansion pack, released on December 18, 2007, introduces airplanes into the scenarios. It includes a set of 8 painted miniature planes, air rules for scenarios, updated command cards, and updated scenarios.

The 8 painted Aircraft are:
USA:
 Lockheed P-38 Lightning
 Curtiss P-40 Warhawk
 Vought F4U Corsair

United Kingdom
 Supermarine Spitfire

Soviet Union:
 Yakovlev Yak-1 (also used for the 7 and 9 series)

Germany:
 Messerschmitt Bf 109
 Fieseler Fi 156 Storch

Japan:
 Mitsubishi A6M Zero

Air Pack

As of December 17, 2013 the Air Pack has been discontinued and is now only available as a PDF download on Days of Wonder's website. Link to PDF in The Store

New Flight Plan
A whole new air expansion that streamlines and simplifies the rules of the original Air Pack with brand new rules for air to ground and air to air warfare. Alongside new rules, the expansion also included 16 unpainted airplane miniatures, 30 air combat cards, 8 reference cards for the airplanes, 15 nation markers for the airplanes, 18 machine gun markers, 12 bomb markers, 1 rules booklet and 1 booklet with 21 new scenarios. The expansion was released at the end of May 2019. New Flight Plan

Mediterranean Theatre
This expansion introduces the British army, consisting of infantry, 25 pounder gun-howitzers, and Crusader tanks. It also includes new terrain, obstacles, badges, rules, 8 new scenarios, and a new class of equipment: special weapons.
Mediterranean Theater

Campaign Bag
An olive drab game bag with several pockets. On the outside are Memoir 44 logos and other artwork. It is large enough to store two copies of the original game and all the current expansions. Comes with an additional two-sided paper breakthrough map. On one side of the new breakthrough map is regular terrain. On the other side is a brand new breakthrough scenario called breakthrough to gembloux.
Campaign Bag

Battlemap Series
Days of Wonder also chose to not only create Overlord scenarios for army packs or online only. They started to create battlemaps themselves. These battlemaps are large battles played in Overlord style (or even bigger, as is the case with Tigers in the Snow). Another feature of the battlemaps is that it includes extra materials, like miniatures or new cards. Battlemaps have included "Hedgerow Hell", "Tigers in the Snow", "Sword of Stalingrad", "Disaster at Dieppe", "Battles of Khalkin Gol", and "Through Jungle and Desert". Battlemap Series

Campaign Books
Two campaign books have been published by Days of Wonder.

Campaign Book Volume 1
Campaign Book Volume 1 was published in 2009 and contains fifty scenarios and campaign rules in which players can play many of these scenarios together in larger campaigns, some scenarios found in the Campaign Book Volume 1 require the Terrain Pack & Eastern Front.  As of December 17, 2013 this volume has been Out Of Print and is now only available as a PDF download.
Campaign Book Volume 1

Campaign Book Volume 2
Campaign Book Volume 2 was published in 2011, expanding on the campaign rules found in Campaign Book Volume 1, Campaign Book Volume 2 contains 46 scenarios which are covered in 11 different campaigns.  Some scenarios found in the Campaign Book Volume 2 require the Terrain Pack & Pacific & Air Pack.
Campaign Book Volume 2

Awards and honors
Memoir'44
 2004 Charles S. Roberts Best World War II Boardgame Nominee
 2004 International Gamers Awards - General Strategy; Two-players
 2004 France - Nominee Tric Trac
 2005 Årets Spill Best Strategy Game Winner
 2005 Games Magazine Best New Historical Simulation Game Winner
 2005 Wargamer.com Award of Excellence
 2005 Boardgameratings.com Best 2 player Game

References

External links
 Memoir '44 official site, with rules and extra scenarios
 
 Brummbar '44 Fan site with painting tips and tutorials on making 3d terrain.

Embracer Group franchises
Board games introduced in 2004
World War II board wargames
Board games with a modular board
Days of Wonder games
Richard Borg games